Aleksey Baranov (born 26 May 1954) is a Soviet skier. He competed in the Nordic combined event at the 1976 Winter Olympics.

References

External links
 

1954 births
Living people
Soviet male Nordic combined skiers
Olympic Nordic combined skiers of the Soviet Union
Nordic combined skiers at the 1976 Winter Olympics
Place of birth missing (living people)